The Divan-begi was a high-ranking official in Judicial system of Safavid Iran (1501–1736), who acted as chief justice of Safavid capital and all over the kingdom's courts. It was the Persian form of Turkic Diwan-begi office, also known as the Imperial Chief Justice or Lord High Justice. Divan-begis presided over an appeals court for the kingdom, except for cases involving military officers or religious officials. Divan-begis had deputies to assist them.

List of Divan-begis

Reign of Ismail I 
 Khadem Beg Talish (1501)
 Beiram Beg Qaramanlu (1501–1514)
 Husam Beg Qaramanlu (1514)
 Amir Harun (1514)

Reign of Tahmasp I 
 Kopek Sultan Ustajlu (1524)
 Mohammad Khan Takkalu (1543/4)
 Ebrahim Khan (1541–1557)
  (1550)
 Badhr Khan (1551)
 Ebrahim Khan (1554–1566)

Reign of Ismail II 
 Ebrahim Mirza (1576)
 Shahrokh Khan Dhu'l-Qadr (1576)

Reign of Mohammad Khodabanda 
 Hamzeh Khan Ustajlu (1578)
 Salman Khan Ustajlu (1582)
 Ali-qoli Khan Ustajlu (1585)
 Ismail-qoli Khan(1586)

Reign of Abbas I 
 Baktash Khan Afshar (1588)
 Khan Mohammad (1602/3)
 Ali-qoli Khan Shamlu (1605–1624)
 Agha Beg (1624–1627)
 Kalb-Ali Beg (1627–1629)

Reign of Safi 
 Rostam Beg (1629–1635)
 Ali-qoli Beg (1635–1642)

Reign of Abbas II 
 Morteza-qoli Beg Shamlu (1642–1645)
 Oghurlu Beg Qajar (28 November 1645–1657)
 Safi-qoli Beg (1657–1663)
 Evaz Beg (1663)

Reign of Suleiman I 
 Abbas-qoli Beg (1663–1666)
 Mohammad-qoli Khan (1666)
 ? (1666)
 Abu'l-Qasem Beg Shamlu (1670/1)
 Mohammad-Hassan (1673)
 Zeinal Khan (1680)
 Rostam Beg (1691)
 Musa Beg (1692–1696)

Reign of Sultan Husayn 
 Musa Beg (1692–1696)
 Ali-Mardan Khan (1696)
 Yar-Mohammad (1697/8)
 Safi-qoli Beg (1697/8)
 Levan Mirza (1700)
 Safi-qoli Khan (1712–February 1715)
 Ismail Beg (1715–1716)
 Jafar Khan (1716)
 Safi-qoli Khan (1716)
 Mohammad-qoli Khan (1718–1720)
 Rajab-Ali Beg (1720–1722)

Reign of Abbas III 
 Mohammad-qoli Khan (1732)

Footnotes

Notes

References

Sources 

 
 
 
 
 
 
 
 
 

 
Chief justices